Nyonga is a genus of planthoppers belonging to the family Achilidae.

Species
Species:
 Nyonga satyra (Fennah, 1957)

References

Achilidae